Bellemerella is a genus of fungi in the family Verrucariaceae. All four species are lichenicolous, meaning they grow parasitically on other lichens.

Species
 Bellemerella acarosporae  – host: Acarospora fuscata
 Bellemerella polysporinae  – host: Polysporina simplex
 Bellemerella ritae  – host: Xylographa
 Bellemerella trapeliae  – host: Trapelia

References

Eurotiomycetes genera
Lichen genera
Verrucariales
Lichenicolous fungi
Taxa named by Claude Roux
Taxa described in 1997